l'Aiguille is a railway station in Bosmie-l'Aiguille, Nouvelle-Aquitaine, France. The station is located on the Limoges-Bénédictins - Périgueux railway line. The station is served by TER (local) services operated by SNCF.

Train services
The following services call at l'Aiguille as of January 2021:
local service (TER Nouvelle-Aquitaine) Limoges - Thiviers - Périgueux - Bordeaux
local service (TER Nouvelle-Aquitaine) Limoges - Saint-Yrieix - Brive-la-Gaillarde

References

Railway stations in France opened in 1897
Railway stations in Haute-Vienne